Willian Giaretton (born 26 September 1990) is a Brazilian rower. He competed in the men's lightweight double sculls event at the 2016 Summer Olympics.

References

External links
 

1990 births
Living people
Brazilian male rowers
Olympic rowers of Brazil
Rowers at the 2016 Summer Olympics
Place of birth missing (living people)
World Rowing Championships medalists for Brazil
Pan American Games medalists in rowing
Pan American Games bronze medalists for Brazil
Rowers at the 2019 Pan American Games
Medalists at the 2019 Pan American Games